Elections to Penwith District Council were held for all 34 new seats in 1979, after ward changes the year before.

After the election, the composition of the council was: 28 Independents, 4 Conservatives and 1 Labour. The Liberals and Mebyon Kernow did not win any seats.

Results

Ward results

Hayle Gwinear (2 seats)

Hayle Gwithian (3 seats)

Lelant & Carbis Bay (2 seats)

Ludgvan (3 seats)

Marazion (1 seat)

Penzance Central (2 seats)

Penzance East (3 seats)

Penzance North (2 seats)

Penzance South (3 seats)

Penzance West (2 seats)

Perranuthnoe (1 seat)

St Buryan (2 seats)

St Erth and St Hilary (1 seat)

St Ives North (2 seats)

St Ives South (2 seats)

St Just (3 seats)

See also
1976 Penwith District Council election

References

Penwith District Council Election Results 1973-2007

Penwith
Penwith District Council elections
1970s in Cornwall